Peter Lovat Fraser, Baron Fraser of Carmyllie, PC, QC (29 May 1945 – 22 June 2013) was a Scottish politician and advocate.

Early life and family
Fraser's mother died when he was 12 while living in Zambia, where his father was serving as a minister. Anthony Eden, then Prime Minister, intervened at the request of family friend Brendan Bracken to help Fraser obtain a scholarship to Loretto School, Musselburgh, East Lothian, the private school where Eden was a trustee. He graduated BA (Hons) and LLM (Hons), Gonville and Caius College, Cambridge, before going to the University of Edinburgh. He was elected to the Faculty of Advocates in 1969 and in 1972 he lectured part-time in constitutional law at Heriot-Watt University for two years. In 1979 he was appointed Standing Junior Counsel for the Foreign and Commonwealth Office and became a Queen's Counsel in 1982.

In 1969 he married Fiona Murray Mair. The couple had three children: Jane, Jamie and Katie.

Conservative politician
Fraser first stood for Parliament for Aberdeen North in October 1974, but was beaten by Labour's Robert Hughes.

He was elected as a Conservative & Unionist Member of Parliament for South Angus in 1979, where he remained in the House of Commons until June 1987 (from 1983 representing East Angus). He was one of several prominent Conservative MPs to lose their seats in Scotland at the 1987 general election.

He was Parliamentary Private Secretary to George Younger, Secretary of State for Scotland. In 1982 he was appointed Solicitor General for Scotland by Margaret Thatcher and became Lord Advocate in 1989. He was created a life peer as Baron Fraser of Carmyllie, of Carmyllie in the District of Angus on 10 February 1989 and was appointed a member of the Privy Council the same year.

Lockerbie bombing
During his time as Scotland's senior law officer, he was directly responsible for the conduct of the investigation into the bombing of Pan Am Flight 103. Lord Fraser drew up the 1991 indictment against the two accused Libyans and issued warrants for their arrest. But five years after the Pan Am Flight 103 bombing trial, when Abdelbaset al-Megrahi was convicted of 270 counts of murder, he cast doubt upon the reliability of the main prosecution witness, Tony Gauci. According to The Sunday Times of 23 October 2005, Lord Fraser criticised the Maltese shopkeeper, who sold Megrahi the clothing that was used to pack the bomb suitcase, for inter alia being "not quite the full shilling" and "an apple short of a picnic".

Lord Advocate, Colin Boyd, who was chief prosecutor at the Lockerbie trial, reacted by saying: "It was Lord Fraser who, as Lord Advocate, initiated the Lockerbie prosecution. At no stage, then or since, has he conveyed any reservation about any aspect of the prosecution to those who worked on the case, or to anyone in the prosecution service." Boyd asked Lord Fraser to clarify his apparent attack on Gauci by issuing a public statement of explanation.

William Taylor QC, who defended Megrahi at the trial and the appeal, said Lord Fraser should never have presented Gauci as a crown witness: "A man who has a public office, who is prosecuting in the criminal courts in Scotland, has got a duty to put forward evidence based upon people he considers to be reliable. He was prepared to advance Gauci as a witness of truth in terms of identification and, if he had these misgivings about him, they should have surfaced at the time. The fact that he is coming out many years later after my former client has been in prison for nearly four and a half years is nothing short of disgraceful. Gauci's evidence was absolutely central to the conviction and for Peter Fraser not to realise that is scandalous," Taylor said.

Tam Dalyell, former Labour MP who played a crucial role in organising the trial at Camp Zeist in the Netherlands, described Lord Fraser's comments as an 'extraordinary development': "I think there is an obligation for the chairman and members of the Scottish Criminal Cases Review Commission to ask Lord Fraser to see them and testify under oath - it's that serious. Fraser should have said this at the time and, if not then, he was under a moral obligation to do so before the trial at Zeist. I think there will be all sorts of consequences," Dalyell declared.

Later career
Fraser appeared for the United Kingdom in both the European Court of Justice in Luxembourg and the European Court of Human Rights in Strasbourg.

Baron Fraser was elected President of the charity Attend (then National Association of Hospital and Community Friends) and held the position from 1989 until his passing in 2013.

From 1992 to 1995 he was Minister of State at the Scottish Office covering Home Affairs and Health. He was then Minister of State at the Department of Trade and Industry with a responsibility for export promotion and overseas investment with particular emphasis on the oil and gas industry. In 1996 he became Minister for Energy.

In May 2003 First Minister Jack McConnell announced a major public inquiry into the handling of the Scottish Parliament Building project, headed by Lord Fraser. The inquiry heard evidence from architects, civil servants, politicians and the building companies.

In August 2007 he was appointed to the Scottish Broadcasting Commission established by the Scottish Executive.

He was a member of the Parliamentary Joint Committee on Human Rights and lived at Regent Terrace in Edinburgh.

He died on 22 June 2013.

References

Fraser: my Lockerbie trial doubts
Lockerbie: was justice done?
Lockerbie returns to haunt "tricky" Malta witness
Pressure grows for explanation in Lockerbie witness dispute
It's time to look again at Lockerbie
Call to clear up Lockerbie doubt

External links
Official Website of The Rt Hon The Lord Fraser of Carmyllie QC

Lord Advocates
Solicitors General for Scotland
Scottish Conservative Party MPs
UK MPs 1979–1983
UK MPs 1983–1987
Members of the Parliament of the United Kingdom for Scottish constituencies
Members of the Privy Council of the United Kingdom
Academics of Heriot-Watt University
Fraser of Carmyllie
People educated at Loretto School, Musselburgh
Alumni of Gonville and Caius College, Cambridge
Alumni of the University of Edinburgh
1945 births
Members of the Faculty of Advocates
Scottish King's Counsel
20th-century King's Counsel
2013 deaths
Life peers created by Elizabeth II